The UK Singles Chart is one of many music charts compiled by the Official Charts Company that calculates the best-selling singles of the week in the United Kingdom. Before 2004, the chart was only based on the sales of physical singles. This list shows singles that peaked in the Top 10 of the UK Singles Chart during 1985, as well as singles which peaked in 1984 and 1986 but were in the top 10 in 1985. The entry date is when the single appeared in the top 10 for the first time (week ending, as published by the Official Charts Company, which is six days after the chart is announced).

One-hundred and twenty-two singles were in the top ten in 1985. Nine singles from 1984 remained in the top 10 for several weeks at the beginning of the year, while "West End Girls" by Pet Shop Boys was released in 1985 but did not reach its peak until 1986. "Like a Virgin" by Madonna and "Shout" by Tears for Fears were the singles from 1984 to reach their peak in 1985. "Last Christmas" by Wham! and "Do They Know It's Christmas?" by Band Aid both re-entered the top ten at the end of the year after being re-issued. Thirty-five artists scored multiple entries in the top 10 in 1985. A-ha, Billy Idol, Bruce Springsteen, Simple Minds and Whitney Houston were among the many artists who achieved their first UK charting top 10 single in 1985.

The 1984 Christmas number-one, charity single "Do They Know It's Christmas?" by the collective Band Aid, remained at number-one for the first two weeks of 1985. The first new number-one single of the year was "I Want to Know What Love Is" by Foreigner. Overall, twenty different singles peaked at number-one in 1985, with David Bowie, George Michael, Holly Johnson and Phil Collins (2, including their appearances on the Band Aid single) having the joint most singles hit that position.

Background

Multiple entries
One-hundred and twenty-two singles charted in the top 10 in 1985, with one-hundred and fifteen singles reaching their peak this year.

Thirty-five artists scored multiple entries in the top 10 in 1985. Madonna secured the record for most top 10 hits in 1985 with eight hit singles.

Eurythmics were one of a number of artists with two top-ten entries, including the number-one single "There Must Be an Angel (Playing with My Heart)". Billy Idol, Frankie Goes to Hollywood, Marillion, Prince and Tears for Fears were among the other artists who had multiple top 10 entries in 1985.

Chart debuts
Ninety-two artists achieved their first top 10 single in 1985, either as a lead or featured artist. Of these, five  went on to record another top 10 single that year: Billy Idol, Jaki Graham, King, Mai Tai and Marillion. Bruce Springsteen had three other entries in this year.

The following table (collapsed on desktop site) does not include acts who had previously charted as part of a group and secured their first top 10 solo single.

Notes
Stephen Duffy was a drummer in Duran Duran, leaving before they made their top 10 debut. His solo single "Kiss Me" was originally recorded by his band Tin Tin, reaching number 78 in 1984, and was re-released the following year, peaking at number 4. Earth, Wind & Fire's Philip Bailey recorded the duet "Easy Lover" with Phil Collins. The group's four top 10 singles – "September" (3), "Boogie Wonderland" (4), "After the Love Has Gone" (4) and "Let's Groove" (3) – were all achieved prior to 1985.

USA for Africa featured many artists who had previously charted in their own right, including Billy Joel, Bob Dylan, Cyndi Lauper, Daryl Hall, Diana Ross, Dionne Warwick, Harry Belafonte, John Oates, Kenny Loggins, Kenny Rogers, Kim Carnes, Lionel Richie, Michael Jackson, Paul Simon, The Pointer Sisters, Ray Charles, Smokey Robinson, Stevie Wonder and Tina Turner. Other singers had also had top 10 entries before but only as part of a group. This included Bob Geldof (The Boomtown Rats plus Band Aid), Lindsey Buckingham (Fleetwood Mac), Jackie Jackson, La Toya Jackson, Marlon Jackson, Randy Jackson & Tito Jackson (all The Jackson 5). Quincy Jones served as conductor, while David Paich, Greg Phillinganes, John Robinson, Louis Johnson, Michael Boddicker, Michael Omartian, Paulinho Da Costa and Phil Collins were instrumentalists – only Collins had a previous top 10 hit to his name as a singer.

Marc Almond formed the duo Soft Cell with Dave Ball, scoring their signature number-one hit "Tainted Love" in 1981. He landed his first solo top 10 in 1985, "I Feel Love (Medley)" alongside Bronski Beat. Phil Lynott's only top 10 single outside Thin Lizzy came in 1985, a duet with Gary Moore called "Out in the Fields", making number five.

The Crowd was another charity collective who united to raise money in aid of the Bradford City stadium fire. Acts who had formerly reached the top ten included The Barron Knights, Black Lace, Girlschool, Jim Diamond, Joe Fagin, Johnny Logan, Kenny Lynch, Kiki Dee, Motörhead, The Nolans, Paul McCartney, Rolf Harris, Smokie and Tony Christie. Additionally, the singers who had charted with groups previously were Denny Laine (The Moody Blues), Rick Wakeman (Yes), Graham Gouldman (10cc), Rick Wild (The Overlanders), Tony Hicks (The Hollies), John Entwistle (The Who), Chris Norman (Smokie) and Frank Allen (The Searchers).

Chrissie Hynde was a founding member of The Pretenders who made their top 10 debut in 1979 with "Brass in Pocket". Her guest appearance on "I Got You Babe" with UB40 was her first top 10 hit away from the band. Arcadia consisted of three members of Duran Duran as a side project - Simon Le Bon, Nick Rhodes and Roger Taylor - while they were on a short hiatus.

Songs from films
Original songs from various films entered the top 10 throughout the year. These included "Let's Go Crazy" & "Take Me with U" (from Purple Rain), "Don't You (Forget About Me)" (The Breakfast Club), "A View to a Kill" (A View to a Kill), "Crazy for You" & "Gambler" (Vision Quest), "Axel F" (Beverly Hills Cop), "Into the Groove" (Desperately Seeking Susan), "We Don't Need Another Hero (Thunderdome)" (Mad Max Beyond Thunderdome), "Holding Out for a Hero" (Footloose), "St. Elmo's Fire (Man in Motion)" (St. Elmo's Fire), "Say You, Say Me" (White Nights) and "Walking in the Air" (The Snowman).

Charity singles
A number of songs recorded for charity reached the top 10 in the charts in 1985. The supergroup USA for Africa released "We Are the World" to support famine relief efforts across Africa. The song peaked at number-one for 2 weeks from 20 April 1985.

The Crowd released the anthem "You'll Never Walk Alone" in response to the Bradford fire, a disaster at Bradford City's Valley Parade stadium which claimed the lives of 56 people. It spent two weeks at number-one from 15 June 1985.

"Do They Know It's Christmas?" by Band Aid re-entered the top 10 at the end of 1985, having peaked at number-one for 5 weeks in 1984.

Best-selling singles
Jennifer Rush had the best-selling single of the year with "The Power of Love". The single spent ten weeks in the top 10 (including five weeks at number one), sold over 1.28 million copies and was certified platinum by the BPI. "I Know Him So Well" by Elaine Paige & Barbara Dickson came in second place, selling more than 823,000 copies and losing out by around 405,000 sales. Madonna's "Into the Groove", "19" from Paul Hardcastle and "Frankie" by Sister Sledge made up the top five. Singles by David Bowie & Mick Jagger, Phyllis Nelson, Feargal Sharkey, a-ha and King were also in the top ten best-selling singles of the year.

Top-ten singles

Entries by artist

The following table shows artists who achieved two or more top 10 entries in 1985, including singles that reached their peak in 1984. The figures include both main artists and featured artists, while appearances on ensemble charity records are also counted for each artist. The total number of weeks an artist spent in the top ten in 1985 is also shown.

Notes

 "West End Girls" reached its peak of number-one on 11 January 1986 (week ending).
 Released as a charity single by Band Aid to aid famine relief in Ethiopia.
 "Do They Know It's Christmas" was re-issued in 1985 and re-entered the top 10 at number 6 on 14 December 1985 (week ending), rising to number 3 on 21 December 1985 (week ending).
 "Last Christmas" was re-issued in 1985 and re-entered the top 10 at number 10 on 21 December 1985 (week ending), rising to number 6 on 28 December 1985.
 Released as a charity single by USA for Africa to aid famine relief in Africa, especially Ethiopia. The single featured mainly American artists on vocals and instruments.
 Released as a charity single by The Crowd to raise money for families of the Bradford City stadium fire victims.
 "Holiday" originally peaked at number 6 on its initial release in 1984.
 "Drive" originally peaked at number 5 on its initial release in 1984. After The Cars performed the song at Live Aid in Philadelphia, it re-charted in the UK, reaching a new peak of number 4.
 Figure includes an appearance on the "We Are the World" charity single by USA for Africa.
 Figure includes single that first charted in 1984 but peaked in 1985.
 Figure includes an appearance on the "Do They Know It's Christmas?" charity single by Band Aid.
 Figure includes single that peaked in 1984.
 Figure includes two top 10 hits with the group Wham!.
 Figure includes a top 10 hit with the group Frankie Goes to Hollywood.
 Figure includes a top 10 hit with the group U2.
 Figure includes a top 10 hit with the group Duran Duran.
 Paul McCartney contributed a spoken-word section on the B-Side of "You'll Never Walk Alone".
 Figure includes an appearance on the "You'll Never Walk Alone" charity single by The Crowd.
 Figure includes a top 10 hit with the group The Style Council.

See also
1985 in British music
List of number-one singles from the 1980s (UK)

References
General

Specific

External links
1985 singles chart archive at the Official Charts Company (click on relevant week)
Official Top 40 best-selling songs of 1985 at the Official Charts Company

United Kingdom
Top 10 singles
1985